Henry Merwin Shrady (October 12, 1871 – April 12, 1922) was an American sculptor, best known for the Ulysses S. Grant Memorial on the west front of the United States Capitol in Washington, D.C.

Background
Shrady was born in New York City. His father, George Frederick Shrady, Sr., was one of the physicians who attended Ulysses S. Grant during the former president's struggle with throat cancer.

In 1894, Shrady graduated from Columbia University, where he was a member of the Varsity Show, and then spent one year at Columbia's law school. He left law school to join with his brother-in-law, Jay Gould (son of the financier Edwin Gould), at the Continental Match Company. The company failed, and Shrady contracted typhoid fever, which diverted him forever from the business world. His recuperation left spare time to pursue a growing interest in art.

Shrady's wife, Harrie Moore, submitted some of his paintings to an exhibition of the National Academy of Design without his knowledge, and they sold quickly. He then began to teach himself sculpture using zoo animals and his pets as models.

He modeled a series of popular bronze statuettes, mostly of animals. His first major commission came in 1901, for George Washington at Valley Forge, an equestrian statue for Continental Army Plaza in Brooklyn, New York.

Grant Memorial

Shrady and architect Edward Pearce Casey won the competition to build the Ulysses S. Grant Memorial in 1902. In the twenty years Shrady spent executing its sculpture program, he studied biology at the American Museum of Natural History and dissected horses to gain a better understanding of animal anatomy. The memorial was dedicated on April 27, 1922, two weeks after Shrady's death.

The Grant Memorial is described as "one of the most important sculptures in Washington" by James M. Goode in The Outdoor Sculpture of Washington, D.C. It consists of a colossal equestrian statue of Grant atop a marble pedestal with bas relief plaques, guarded by four lions. Large sculpture groups of the Cavalry and Artillery flank this to the north and south, with a reflecting pool to the west.

Legacy

In 1908, the Roman Bronze Works built a home and studio for Shrady at White Plains, New York.  It was added to the National Register of Historic Places in 1982 as the Leo Friedlander Studio.

Shrady's papers are in the Archives of American Art at the Smithsonian Institution.

His son, Frederick Charles Shrady (1907–1990), became a sculptor.

Selected works

Statuettes
 Bull Moose (1900)
 Empty Saddle (1900)
 Saving the Colors (c. 1900)
 Elk Buffalo ("Monarch of the Plains") (1901)
 Buffalo (1903)
 Fighting Buffalo (1903)
 Cavalry Charge (1902–1916, cast 1924), Metropolitan Museum of Art, New York City. This is a miniature version of the sculpture group from the Grant Memorial.

Sculptures
 George Washington at Valley Forge (1901–1906), Continental Army Plaza, Brooklyn, New York.
A 1925 replica is in Washington Square Park, Kansas City, Missouri.
 Ulysses S. Grant Memorial (1902–1922), West Front, United States Capitol, Washington D.C.
 General Alpheus S. Williams Memorial (1912–1921), Belle Isle Park, Detroit, Michigan.
 Robert Edward Lee Sculpture (1917–1924), Lee Park, Charlottesville, Virginia. Completed by Leo Lentelli following Shrady's 1922 death.
 Jay Cooke Monument (1921), Jay Cooke Plaza, Duluth, Minnesota.

Gallery

References
Citations

Bibliography
 Montagna, Dennis R., Henry Merwin Shrady's Ulysses S. Grant Memorial in Washington, D.C.: A Study in Iconography, Content and Patronage, Doctoral dissertation, University of Delaware, 1987
 Nawrocki, Dennis Alan and Thomas J. Holleman, Art in Detroit Public Places, Wayne State University Press, Detroit, Michigan,  1980
 Opitz, Glenn B, Editor, Mantle Fielding’s Dictionary of American Painters, Sculptors & Engravers, Apollo Book, Poughkeepsie NY, 1986
 Taft, Lorado, The History of American Sculpture, MacMillan Co., New York, NY, 1925

External links
 .

1871 births
1922 deaths
Artists from New York City
20th-century American sculptors
20th-century American male artists
American male sculptors
Sculptors from New York (state)
Columbia College (New York) alumni